Diogo Johannes Antonius Reesink (28 July 1934 – 30 May 2019) was a Brazilian-Dutch Roman Catholic bishop.

Reesink was born in the Netherlands and was ordained to the priesthood in 1962. He served as bishop of the Roman Catholic Diocese of Almenara, Brazil, from 1989 to 1998. He then served as the Bishop of the Roman Catholic Diocese of Teófilo Otoni, Brazil, from 1998 to 2009.

Notes

1934 births
2019 deaths
20th-century Roman Catholic bishops in Brazil
20th-century Dutch Roman Catholic priests
21st-century Roman Catholic bishops in Brazil
Roman Catholic bishops of Almenara
Roman Catholic bishops of Teófilo Otoni